Pierre Hemmer may refer to:
 Pierre Hemmer (athlete)
 Pierre Hemmer (entrepreneur)